Verlyn Klinkenborg (born 1952 in Meeker, Colorado) is an American non-fiction author, academic, and former newspaper editor, known for his writings on rural America.

Early life and education

Klinkenborg was born in Meeker, Colorado and raised on a farm in Iowa. He attended elementary school in Clarion, Iowa until the 6th grade before his family relocated to Osage, Iowa. His family then moved to Sacramento, California.

Klinkenborg attended the University of California, Berkeley before earning a Bachelor of Arts degree in English literature from Pomona College. He then earned a Ph.D from Princeton University, also in English literature.

Career 
Klinkenborg taught literature and creative writing at Fordham University while living in The Bronx in the early to mid-1980s. He later taught at St. Olaf College, Bennington College, Sarah Lawrence College, Bard College, and Harvard University. In 1991, he received the Lila Wallace–Reader's Digest Writer's Award and a National Endowment for the Arts fellowship.

Klinkenborg's books include More Scenes from the Rural Life (Princeton Architectural Press), Making Hay and The Last Fine Time.

His book Timothy; or, Notes of an Abject Reptile concerns the tortoise which the English eighteenth century parson-naturalist Gilbert White inherited from his aunt, as described in his 1789 book The Natural History and Antiquities of Selborne. In the first half of 2006, Klinkenborg posted a farm and garden blog  about The Rural Life, consisting of entries from the daily journal kept by Gilbert White in Selborne in 1784, and his own complementary daily entries.

From 1997 to 2013, he was a member of the editorial board of The New York Times.

Klinkenborg has published articles in The New Yorker, Harper's Magazine, Esquire, National Geographic and Mother Jones magazines.

He has written a series of editorial opinions in The New York Times; these are generally literary meditations on rural farm life. On December 26, 2013, he announced in that column that it was to be the last he would be writing in that space.

From 2006 to 2007, he was a visiting writer-in-residence at Pomona College, where he taught nonfiction writing. In 2007, he received a Guggenheim fellowship, which funded his book The Mermaids of Lapland, about William Cobbett. In 2012, he published “Several Short Sentences About Writing”.

He currently teaches creative writing at Yale University and lives on a small farm in Upstate New York.

Bibliography

Books
The Rural Life
More Scenes from the Rural Life (Princeton Architectural Press)
Making Hay 
The Last Fine Time
Timothy; or, Notes of an Abject Reptile
 Several Short Sentences About Writing

Book reviews

References

External links 
 Biography from The New York Times
 "Once a progressive state, Minnesota is now a fief of the NRA" from The New York Times, September 5, 2006
 Who is Verlyn Klinkenborg and why should we care? (2006)

1952 births
Living people
20th-century American non-fiction writers
20th-century American male writers
21st-century American non-fiction writers
American Book Award winners
American newspaper editors
Bard College faculty
Harvard University faculty
Journalists from Upstate New York
People from Clarion, Iowa
People from Meeker, Colorado
People from Osage, Iowa
Place of birth missing (living people)
Pomona College alumni
Princeton University alumni
The New York Review of Books people
The New York Times columnists
Watson Fellows
Writers from Iowa
Writers from New York (state)
American male non-fiction writers
21st-century American male writers